Alexandria "Lexie" Laing is an American ice hockey forward, currently playing for the Minnesota Whitecaps of the Premier Hockey Federation (PHF).

Career 
During high school, Laing played for the Noble and Greenough School, serving as team captain for the 2013–14 season and being named NEPSAC Division I Player of the Year in 2014. She also played for Assabet Valley. She received the 2014 John Carlton Memorial Award.

From 2014 to 2019, she attended Harvard University, playing for the university's women's ice hockey programme. She scored 25 points in 36 games in her rookie NCAA season, being named a finalist for the ECAC Rookie of the Year Award and notching two assists in Harvard's Beanpot victory over Boston College. She captained Harvard in her final season with the team, putting up a career-high 26 points in 31 games, leading the team in scoring and being named an All-Ivy Honorable Mention. 

She was selected 12th overall by the Boston Pride in the 2017 NWHL Draft, and would go on to sign her first professional contract with the club after graduating. In her first season with the Pride, she scored 27 points in 24 games, the fourth leading scorer on her team and eight overall in the league. She was named to Team Dempsey for the 2020 NWHL All-Star Game.

International career  
Laing represented the United States at the 2013 and 2014 IIHF World Women's U18 Championship, scoring a total of nine points in ten games as the country won silver both times.

Style of play   
On top of her offensive abilities, Laing has been noted both for her strong two-way play and skills as a faceoff specialist, drawing comparisons to Boston Bruins centre Patrice Bergeron.

Personal life 
Laing has a bachelor's degree in Integrative Biology from Harvard University and a master's degree in Animals and Public Policy from the Cummings School of Veterinary Medicine at Tufts University. Her two older sisters, Brianna and Denna Laing, have also played for the Boston Pride.

Career Statistics

External links

References 

Boston Pride players
1996 births
Living people
American women's ice hockey forwards
Harvard Crimson women's ice hockey players
Ice hockey players from Massachusetts
People from Marblehead, Massachusetts
Cummings School of Veterinary Medicine alumni
Noble and Greenough School alumni
Sportspeople from Essex County, Massachusetts
Minnesota Whitecaps players
Premier Hockey Federation players